McLagan is a surname. Notable people with the surname include:

Angus McLagan (1891–1956), New Zealand politician
Ian McLagan (1945–2014), English musician
Jennifer McLagan, Canadian chef and food writer
John McLagan (1838–1901), Canadian newspaper publisher
Kim McLagan (1948–2006), English model
Peter McLagan (1823–1900), British politician
Sara Anne McLagan (c. 1856–1924), Canadian newspaper publisher

See also
Maclagan (disambiguation)